Activating signal cointegrator 1 complex subunit 3 is a protein that in humans is encoded by the ASCC3 gene.

Interactions 

ASCC3 has been shown to interact with RELA, C-jun and Serum response factor.

References

External links

Further reading